Devis Favaro (born 1 June 1972) is a former Italian hurdler.

Biography
He was finalist at the 2002 European Athletics Championships held in Munich, his personal best 13:59, set that final, is the 10th best Italian performance of all-time at the end of 2020 season. He was also silver medal at the 2001 Mediterranean Games held in Tunis and at the 2002 World Military Track and Field Championships held in Tivoli.

Achievements

See also
 Italian all-time lists - 110 metres hurdles

References

External links
 

1972 births
Living people
Italian male hurdlers
Athletics competitors of Gruppo Sportivo Forestale
Mediterranean Games silver medalists for Italy
Athletes (track and field) at the 2001 Mediterranean Games
Mediterranean Games medalists in athletics